The Slovenian Women's League, known as Ženska nogometna liga Triglav Zdravje due to sponsorship reasons, is the top-level women's football league of Slovenia. It was founded in 1992 and currently features eight teams.

The league champions earn a place in the UEFA Women's Champions League the following season.

Format
The teams play each other three times per season, and thus every team plays 21 matches. There is no relegation system in place.
Between 2010–11 and 2017–18, a playoff system was adopted. After the regular season, the top four and the bottom four teams played each other once more with the points added to the regular season record. After that, the winner of the top 4 group was crowned champion.

2022–23 teams

Winners

By season
All winners of the Slovenian Women's League

1992–93: Krim
1993–94: Tesar
1994–95: Ilirija
1995–96: Jarše
1996–97: Ilirija
1997–98: Ilirija
1998–99: Jarše
1999–2000: Rudar Škale
2000–01: Ilirija
2001–02: Rudar Škale
2002–03: Krka
2003–04: Krka
2004–05: Krka
2005–06: Pomurje
2006–07: Krka
2007–08: Krka
2008–09: Krka
2009–10: Krka
2010–11: Krka
2011–12: Pomurje
2012–13: Pomurje
2013–14: Pomurje
2014–15: Pomurje
2015–16: Pomurje
2016–17: Olimpija Ljubljana
2017–18: Olimpija Ljubljana
2018–19: Pomurje
2019–20: No winners (COVID-19 pandemic)
2020–21: Pomurje
2021–22: Pomurje

By titles

Top scorers
The following is a list of the league's top scorers since the 2000–01 season. Tanja Vrabel have won the award a record six times. In the 2021–22 season, Ana Milović achieved the highest number of goals per season, scoring 66 goals in 19 games.

References

External links
Official website 
Slovenian League at Sccerway

Top level women's association football leagues in Europe
1
Sports leagues established in 1992
1992 establishments in Slovenia
Women
Football